Posies may refer to:

Plural of posy
 Butterflies of the genus Drupadia
The Posies, American alternative rock music group

See also

 
 
 
Poses (disambiguation)
Poise (disambiguation)